Claudiney Ramos (15 March 1980 – 8 July 2013) was a professional footballer. He was nicknamed Rincón, because of his physical resemblance to former Corinthians player, Colombian Freddy Rincón. Born in Brazil, he represented the Equatorial Guinea national team.

International career
Rincón was part of a lot of Brazilian players that the Ministry of Sports of Equatorial Guinea had naturalized (purchased) in September 2012 to strengthen its national team and try to trace the tie 04 for the 2013 Africa Cup of Nations against Congo DR. Then, he made his début for Equatorial Guinea on 14 October 2012 in the return match versus Congo DR. The game was won by 2–1, but it wasn't enough to qualify for the competition. In March the following year, Rincón scored the winning goal in a 2014 FIFA World Cup qualifying match against Cape Verde, being that his greatest moment of international notoriety, which lost all its value posthumously. Eleven days after his death, FIFA awarded the points of the match to Cape Verde, considering that his teammate Emilio Nsue was not regularized.

Death 
Rincón had represented Equatorial Guinea in June 2013, playing three matches (two FIFA World Cup qualifiers and one friendly) between days 5 and 16. During that trip, he contracted malaria but felt symptoms only three weeks later, in Brazil. He was hospitalized in Sorocaba Hospital, where he died on the morning of July 8. Rincón was 33 and at the time of his death, he was under contract with EC Avenida.

References

External links

1980 births
2013 deaths
Sportspeople from Paraná (state)
Deaths from malaria
Equatoguinean footballers
Equatorial Guinea international footballers
Brazilian footballers
Equatoguinean people of Brazilian descent
Grêmio Barueri Futebol players
Esporte Clube Taubaté players
Ceilândia Esporte Clube players
Esporte Clube Santo André players
Paulista Futebol Clube players
Guarani FC players
São Bernardo Futebol Clube players
Agremiação Sportiva Arapiraquense players
Macaé Esporte Futebol Clube players
União São João Esporte Clube players
Associação Olímpica de Itabaiana players
Association football midfielders